Daniele Macuglia (born February 22, 1984) is an Italian physicist and historian of science.
He is currently assistant professor of the history of science at Peking University.
Before moving to Beijing, he was a research fellow at the Neubauer Collegium for Culture and Society at the University of Chicago.

Biography
Born in Tolmezzo, Italy, Macuglia earned his PhD in history and philosophy of science from the University of Chicago, defending his doctoral dissertation in 2016. He completed summa cum laude graduate training in physics at the University of Pavia. An alumnus of the Institute for Advanced Studies of Pavia, he worked in Chicago under American physicist Leo P. Kadanoff.

Macuglia occasionally collaborates with Italian TV personality Francesco Bellissimo to promote Italian culinary history and safeguard lost recipes, especially exploring the time of Leonardo da Vinci. The two have organized a variety of lectures and public events in Asia and the US, with support from the cultural offices of various Italian consulates and embassies.

Awards 

Macuglia has been awarded first prize at the Italian national contest "I Giovani e le Scienze" as well as a Special Prize at the European Union Contest for Young Scientists. In 2020 he was awarded the prize for best communication on the history of science by the Italian Physical Society.

References

External links 
 Daniele Macuglia Official site 

1984 births
Living people
Historians of science
21st-century Italian physicists
University of Chicago alumni
University of Pavia alumni